The Gunn Report and Showreel of the Year, authored by Donald Gunn and Emma Wilkie, is an annual publication identifying and detailing the most awarded new work within the advertising industry.

The first Report was published in 1999, and has since grown to be one of the most authoritative analyses of advertising campaigns worldwide, with findings republished in both industry journals (e.g. Advertising Age, Campaign) and mainstream newspapers (e.g. The Wall Street Journal, The Guardian, USA Today, Le Figaro, The Financial Times and The Sunday Telegraph).

Methodology

The Gunn Report combines the winners’ lists from “all the most important advertising awards contests”, so as to establish comprehensive annual worldwide league tables. The Gunn Report publishes such league tables for Film, Print, Digital and ‘All Gunns Blazing’ (the latter typically referred to elsewhere within the industry as ‘integrated’, 'innovative', 'titanium' et al.). Meanwhile, league tables for the most awarded countries, advertisers, production companies, agencies, digital agencies and agency networks are also formulated and published annually.

Results from forty-six global, regional and national shows are combined, although The Gunn Report and its authors have intentionally never disclosed which specific shows and contests these are.

References

`

Advertising awards
Publications established in 1999
Works about advertising